Jan Mazoch (born 5 September 1985) is a Czech former ski jumper. He became a regular member of the Czech national team in 2003. Mazoch was a member of the Czech delegation at the 2002 and 2006 Winter Olympics.

He is the grandson of legendary ski-jumper Jiří Raška. He has one daughter, Viktoria, born on 20 June 2007.

Career
Mazoch made his ski competition debut in the World Cup competition held on 13 March 2002 in Falun, Sweden. That same year, he competed in the Junior World Championship where he placed 9th and finished in 26th place at the Ski Flying World Championship. In his Winter Olympic Games debut at Salt Lake City, he placed 35th.

In 2003 he finished the Championship of the Czech Republic in 1st place and took part in the World Championships in Val di Fiemme, Italy.

During the 2004 season, Mazoch took 2nd place at the FIS Continental Cup competition in Rovaniemi, Finland.

In 2005, he competed in the World Championship in Oberstdorf, Germany, where he earned 28th place in the individual competition and a 7th place in the team competition.

In 2006, he returned to Winter Olympic competition at the Winter Olympic Games in Torino, Italy where he placed 9th in the team large hill event.

Zakopane crash
During the 2007 season, Mazoch competed in the World Cup event in Zakopane, Poland on 20 January 2007 where he posted a career-best 15th position after his first jump. On his second jump the wind lift suddenly disappeared. As a result, Mazoch lost control just prior to landing and crashed to the ground.

Rescue personnel rushed Mazoch to a nearby medical facility where he remained in critical condition. Later that day he was transported to a hospital in Kraków, Poland where he was placed in a medically induced coma to prevent any further injuries. He had sustained serious brain injuries, but no other internal injuries and only some minor skin damage.

On 22 January Mazoch was brought out of the coma and transported to an undisclosed location in the Czech Republic for rehabilitation.

Return to the hill and end of career
In August 2007, barely 7 months after the Zakopane accident, Mazoch returned to the slopes and made his first jump. In September that year he returned to competition at the Continental Cup event in Villach, Austria, where he finished 7th on the normal hill. The following year he began summer training for the 2008 season. He competed through the 2008 season but was never able to regain the form and confidence he'd known before. As a result, he chose to end his career.

References

External links
 Official Homepage

1985 births
Living people
Czech male ski jumpers
Olympic ski jumpers of the Czech Republic
Ski jumpers at the 2002 Winter Olympics
Ski jumpers at the 2006 Winter Olympics
People from Frýdek-Místek District
Sportspeople from the Moravian-Silesian Region